"Pills n Potions" is a song by rapper Nicki Minaj from her third studio album, The Pinkprint (2014). It was released on May 21, 2014, by Young Money, Cash Money, and Republic Records as the lead single from the album. Minaj collaborated with Cirkut, Dr. Luke, and Ester Dean during the songwriting process, while Cirkut and Dr. Luke produced it.

Commercially, the song peaked at number 24 on the US Billboard Hot 100 and within the top 40 in Australia, Ireland, New Zealand and the United Kingdom. The song's accompanying music video was directed by Diane Martel, who Minaj has previously worked with, and was released on June 9, 2014. Minaj promoted the song by performing it live at the BET Awards 2014.

Background and release

Minaj first mentioned the song in her promo single, "Yasss Bish" which features Soulja Boy. She stated that the single would be released in two weeks. She revealed the title of the song at the 2014 Billboard Music Awards and afterwards hosted a Q&A on Twitter where she revealed information regarding the single. In an interview for Rap-Up, she stated that "Pills n Potions" was "uplifting" and "very soulful". Speaking to Billboard, she explained: "It sounds like urgency, It sounds like betrayal. It sounds like running. It sounds like fainting. It sounds like love. It sounds like – *gasp!*" On May 19, 2014, Minaj revealed the single's cover art on Instagram.

On May 24, 2014, Minaj premiered "Pills n Potions" on SoundCloud, with song being available for purchase on iTunes later that day. She promoted the single by means of several radio interviews throughout the United States, including Power 105.1's The Breakfast Club, KIIS-FM's On Air with Ryan Seacrest, Hot 97's morning show, Z100 with Elvis Duran and the Morning Show and a sit down interview for Power 106's The Big Boy's Neighborhood Morning Show.

Composition

"Pills n Potions" is a pop and hip hop piano ballad "framed in the druggy imagery of mixtape rap". Chris Payne of Billboard said the song coupled a chorus "reminiscent of a Rihanna ballad" with rapped verses. Kory Grow of Rolling Stone opined that the song shows Minaj "sublimely (and maturely) rising above her detractors, even singing that she still loves them."

The song opens with a sparse, haunting drum beat, while Minaj sings the pre-chorus in a feather-like near-whisper, "Pills 'n potions, we're overdosin'/I'm angry but I still love you". As the pre-chorus repeats, an echo effect is added to her vocals, and "blooming" chants of "I still love, I still love, I still lu-uh-uhhhv" are sung to create the song's chorus. During the verses Minaj raps with a sense of urgency, however, the first verse is kept restrained as she raps about someone who wronged her, "They could never make me hate you/Even though what you was doin' wasn't tasteful/Even though you out here looking so ungrateful/I'mma keep it movin' be classy and graceful." She later says that she'll "forgive and forget", but knows that they're jealous of her success: "But I spin off in a Benzie/I see the envy when I'm causin' a frenzy".

Critical reception
Zach Frydenlund of Complex called "Pills n Potions" a "monster of a song", and explained, "Nicki shows—once again—how she can delicately balance pop and hip-hop, while spitting true to her 'real rap' promise to fans". Chris Payne of Billboard felt Minaj was sincere in her delivery of the song's personal lyrics, and went on to call it a "crowd pleaser" with something for every listener to enjoy. Gil Kaufman of MTV News wrote that the song was "actually a huge move back into the pop game, setting Minaj up for what could be her biggest cross-over hit to date". Although Marc Hogan of Spin found the song's message confusing, but praised Minaj's rapping and said: "when we hear that Rihanna-like 'I still lo-uh-uh-ve' hook blasting out of car windows this summer? We'll probably still lo-uh-uh-ve it." Kory Grow of Rolling Stone noted that "Pills n Potions" was the "diametric opposite" of Minaj's previous single, "Lookin Ass". XXL featured the song on their mid-year list of 25 Best Songs of 2014 (So Far), commenting that "despite the slow tempo of the song, Nicki was still able to supply her classic witty lines with a hard undertone". In contrast, Meaghan Garvey of Pitchfork described "Pills n Potions" as "cute but hollow, its sentimentality trumped by the album's deeply personal opening triptych."

Music video
The music video for "Pills n Potions" was released on June 9, 2014, on YouTube. American rapper The Game makes a cameo appearance. As of December 2021, the video has more than 238 million views.

Commercial performance
In the United States, "Pills n Potions" debuted at number 47 on the Billboard Hot 100 for the week ending June 7, 2014; it sold 84,000 copies and amassed 709,000 domestic streams within its first four days of release. The song went on to peak at number 24 on the chart. As of December 2014, the song has sold 622,000 copies in the United States.

Charts

Weekly charts

Year-end charts

Certifications

Credits and personnel
Onika Maraj – vocals, songwriting
Lukasz Gottwald – writing, producer
Ester Dean – writing
Henry Walter – writing, producer

Release history

References

2014 singles
2014 songs
2010s ballads
Nicki Minaj songs
Republic Records singles
Cash Money Records singles
Song recordings produced by Cirkut (record producer)
Song recordings produced by Dr. Luke
Songs written by Dr. Luke
Songs written by Nicki Minaj
Songs written by Ester Dean
Songs written by Cirkut (record producer)
Music videos directed by Diane Martel
Pop ballads
Songs about drugs
Songs about alcohol
Songs about heartache